Andrew Jackson Campbell (1828 – December 6, 1894) was an American politician from New York.

Life
Born in Newark, New Jersey, Campbell worked in government as a deputy tax commissioner, clerk of a judicial court and in public works. He was also a merchant in New York City. In 1856, he was elected to the New York City Council. He was a member of the New York State Assembly (New York Co., 9th D.) in 1876.

In 1894, as a Republican, he defeated Democrat Daniel E. Sickles for re-election in New York's 10th congressional district, but died before his term began.

See also
List of members-elect of the United States House of Representatives who never took their seats

Sources
 THE COUNTY TICKET in NYT on October 30, 1875 [gives sketches of the Republican Assembly nominees in NYC]
Death of Andrew J. Campbell in NYT on December 7, 1894

1828 births
1894 deaths
19th-century American politicians
Deaths from kidney disease
Elected officials who died without taking their seats
Republican Party members of the New York State Assembly
New York City Council members
Politicians from Newark, New Jersey